Beru may refer to:

 Beru (atoll), part of Kiribati
 Beru Group, a diesel cold start systems company
 Sherab Palden Beru, a Tibetan painter
 Béru, a village in the Yonne department, in France
 Beru (film) a national awarded Kannada movie, in the year 2004, directed by P. Sheshadri and acted by Suchendra Prasad, HG Dattatreya and others.
 Beru Whitesun, from Star Wars
Beru (drum), Maldivian word for "Drum"
Beru, a character from Doraemon: Nobita's Chronicle of the Moon Exploration